Chanel Simmonds (born 10 August 1992) is a former tennis player from South Africa.

Simmonds won 23 singles titles and 29 doubles titles on the ITF Women's Circuit. On 27 May 2013, she reached her best singles ranking of world No. 158. On 26 August 2013, she peaked at No. 176 in the WTA doubles rankings.

Junior career
In August 2007, Simmonds won her first ITF Junior Circuit singles title at a G-4 event in Gaborone, Botswana.

As a junior, she reached a career-high combined rank of 14, and compiled a singles win–loss record of 95–30.

Grand Slam performance timeline

Singles

Notes

 1 2009: WTA ranking–730, 2010: WTA ranking–358, 2011: WTA ranking–209.
 * 2015: WTA ranking–314, 2016: WTA ranking–395, 2017: WTA ranking–316, 2018: WTA ranking–368.

ITF Circuit finals

Singles: 37 (23 titles, 14 runner–ups)

Doubles: 44 (29 titles, 15 runner–ups)

References

External links
 
 
 

1992 births
Living people
People from Kempton Park, Gauteng
South African female tennis players
African Games silver medalists for South Africa
African Games medalists in tennis
African Games bronze medalists for South Africa
Competitors at the 2011 All-Africa Games
Competitors at the 2019 African Games
Sportspeople from Gauteng
White South African people